Ashok Saraf (Hindi pronunciation: [əʃoːk səɾaːf]; born 4 June 1947) is an Indian actor and comedian. He has played the lead in various Marathi films and stage plays. He has also played supporting roles in Hindi films. He received five Filmfare Awards, Maharashtra government award for the film Pandu Havaldar, Screen Award for Sawai Havaldar, Bhojpuri Film Award for Maika Bitua, ten state government awards for Marathi films and Best Comedian in Maharashtracha Favorite Kon?. 

From the early 1980s, Saraf started getting cast as the leading hero in Marathi films. The combination of Ashok Saraf, Laxmikant Berde, Sachin Pilgaonkar and Mahesh Kothare created the "comedy films wave" in Marathi cinema from 1985 that lasted for more than a decade. His successful Marathi films as the lead hero include Ek Daav Bhutacha, Dhoom Dhadaka, Gammat Jammat, Ashi hi Banawa Banavi and Vazir. Saraf has also starred in television serials like Yeh Choti Badi Baatein and Hum Paanch (as Anand Mathur).

In Bollywood, he is best remembered for the comic "Munshiji" in Rakesh Roshan's 1995 action thriller Karan Arjun, in Yes Boss as Shah Rukh Khan's friend and as Ajay Devgn's colleague in Singham as head constable. In the Marathi film industry, he is popularly known as "Mama" (maternal uncle).

Early life
Saraf was born in Bombay, (present day Mumbai) on 4 June 1947. He grew up in the South Mumbai neighbourhood of Chikhalwadi and went to DGT Vidyalay for his education. He was named "Ashok" after veteran actor Ashok Kumar. He spent his childhood at Chikhalwadi in South Mumbai. He completed his schooling at DGT Vidyalay Mumbai.

Career
Saraf has been working in the film and television industry since the year 1969. He has acted in more than 250 Marathi films, out of which more than 100 were commercially successful. He has mostly acted in comedy films. He has played many roles in Marathi cinema, Marathi plays, Hindi cinema, Marathi television serials and Hindi television serials. He started his career with the Marathi movie Janaki in 1969. He then acted in the films like Donhi Gharacha Pahuna, Jawal Ye Laju Nako, Tumacha Amacha Jamala, Chimanrao Gundyabhau, Deed Shahane, Haldikunku, Duniya Kari Salam and more during the 1970s and 1980s. He continued to work in Marathi films with Laxmikant Berde, Sachin and Mahesh Kothare. The Marathi films moved into a different term of comedy during that phase. Ashi Hi Banava Banavi, Aayatya Gharat Gharoba, Balache Baap Bramhachari, Bhootacha Bhau and Dhum Dhadaka are some of the notable Marathi films in which Saraf acted.

Saraf has also acted in various Marathi plays and Hindi serials. He then developed his own production house "Aniket Telefilms", which is handled by his wife Nivedita Saraf.

Marathi film career 

Ashok Saraf had success pairing with Laxmikant Berde, another comedian from Marathi cinema who has also acted in many Hindi films. With Saraf, Sachin Pilgaonkar and Laxmikant Berde, together they played in many Marathi films and most films were super-hits. Both Laxmikant and Ashok were known to be good friends of actor-director Sachin Pilgaonkar and actor-producer-director Mahesh Kothare. He tasted major success in Ashi Hi Banwa Banwi (1988), in the lead role with the two reigning superstars of Marathi cinema, Sachin Pilgaonkar and Laxmikant Berde. The movie was a runaway hit.

Hindi film career 
Saraf played important roles in Bollywood. Some of the roles which are remembered are from the films Singham, Pyaar Kiya To Darna Kya, Gupt, Koyla, Yes Boss, Joru Ka Gulaam and Karan Arjun. His performance in films against powerful comedy actors like Govinda, Johny Lever and Kader Khan was praised.

Hindi television serials 
Saraf has also starred in television serials like Yeh Choti Badi Baatein and Hum Paanch (as Anand Mathur), which tasted major success. Ashok Saraf's comedy show Don't Worry Ho Jayega which was at that time telecast on Sahara TV was very popular in the 1990s. The audiences were very excited to watch this show at that time.

Marathi play career 
Saraf has played a number of roles in Marathi plays in his career. Some of the important plays are Hamidabaichi Kothi, Anidhikrut, Manomilan, He Ram Cardiogram, Darling Darling, Sarkha Chatit Dukhtay, Laginghai, and Vacuum Cleaner.

Awards and recognitions 
 1977 - first Filmfare award for Ram Ram Gangaram. In total, 5 Filmfare awards
 Maharashtra government award for the movie Pandu Havaldar
 Screen award for the movie Sawai Havaldar 
 Bhojpuri film award for Maika Bitua
 10 State government awards for Marathi films
 Best Comedian in Maharashtracha Favorite Kon?

Personal life

He is married to actress Nivedita Joshi-Saraf in 1990. They married at the Mangueshi Temple in Goa, where Saraf's family, of the GSB Caste, originally from Goa used to live before moving to Maharashtra. They have a son named Aniket Saraf who is a chef.

Saraf survived a major car accident in the year 2012 on the Mumbai Pune Expressway near Talegaon.

Filmography

Marathi 

 Ved (2022) as Satya's Father 
 JeevanSandhya (2021) as Jeevan Abhyankar
 Prawaas (2020) as Abhijat Inamdar
 Me Shivaji Park (2018) as Digambar Sawant
 Vrundavan as Girdhar Inamdar
 Aandhali Koshimbir (2014) as Bapu Sadavarte
 Ekulti Ek (2013)
 Kunasathi Kunitari (2011) ....
 Pakda Pakdi (2011) ....
 Ideachi Kalpana (2010) .... Advocate Manohar Barshinge
 Most Wanted (2010 film)
 Tata Birla Ani Laila (2010)... Birla
 Aika Dajiba (2010) ....
 Master Eke Master (2009) ....
 Nishani Daava Angatha (2009) ....
 Hastil Tyache Daat Distil (2009) ....
 Balirajache Rajya Yeu De (2009) ....
 Gosht Lagnanantarchi (2009) ....
 Ek Daav Dhobi Pachhad (2008)
 Adala Badali (2008) .... Chandu
 Aaba Zindabad (2008)
 Baba Lagin (2008)
 Anolkhi Hey Ghar Maze (2008) .... Mr. Deshmukh
 Amhi Satpute (2008) .... Anna
 Saade Maade Teen (2008) .... Ratan
 Sakkha Bhau Pakka Vairi (2008)
 Chalu Navra Bholi Bayko (2008)
 Ek Unad Divas (2005)...Mr.Vishwas Dabholkar
 Sakhi (film) (2007)
 Mi Nahi Ho Tyatla (2007)
 Karayla Gelo Ek (2007)
 Lapun Chapun (2007)
 Pahili Sher Dusri Savvasher Navara Pavsher (2006)
 Devaa Shapath Khota Saangen Khara Saangnaar Naahi (2006)
 Shubhmangal Savadhan (2006)
 Kalubaichya Navane Changbhal (2006)
 Akhand Saubhagywati (2006)
 Soon Laadki Saasarachi (2005)
 Saval Majhya Premacha (2005)
 Aai No. 1 (2005)
 Thoda Tum Badlo Thoda Hum (2004) ....
 Navra Maza Navsacha (2004) .... Bus Conductor Lalu
 Sanshay Kallol (2004) ....
 Fukat Chambu Baburao (2004)
 Saglikade Bombabomb (2003)
 Bhajiwali Sakhu Havaldar Bhiku (2000)
 Bhakti Heech Khari Shakti (2000)
 Saubhagyadan (2000) ....
 Bhasma (1999) .... Masanjogi
 Kunku (1997)
 Bal Bramhachari (1996) .... Pyare Mohan
 Gehra Raaz (1996)
 Maaya Mamata (1996)
 Topi Var Topi (1995)
 Dhamal Jodi (1995)
 Painjan (1995)
 Sukhi Sansarachi 12 Sutre (1995)
 Vazir (1994)
 Sasar Maaher (1994)
 Ghayaal (1993)
 Aaplee Maanse (1993)
 Lapandav (1993).....Abhijeet Samarth
 Wajva Re Wajva (1993).... Uttam Tople
 Tu Sukhakarta (1993)
 Premankur (1993)
 Wat Pahate Punvechi (1993)
 Shubh Mangal Savdhan (1992)
 Aikaav Te Nawalach (1992)
 Than Than Gopala (1992)
 Dhar Pakad (1992)
 Zhunj Tujhi Majhi (1992)
 Aayatya Gharat Gharoba (1991) ... Gopinath Kirtikar 
 Aflatoon (1991) .... Bajarang Rav
 Chaukat Raja (1991) Gana
 Godi Gulabi (1991)
 Jasa Baap Tashi Poore (1991) .... Raja
 Mumbai Te Mauritius (1991) .... Prem Ladku a.k.a. Bombay to Mauritius (International: English title)
 Anapekshit (1991) .... Uttam Rao Pawar
 Balidaan (1991)
 Thamb Thamb Jau Nako Lamb (1990)
 Ina Mina Dika (1990) .... Mina
 Shejari Shejari (1990) .... Keshav Kulkarni
 Aamchya Sarkhe Aamhich (1990) ... Bhupal / Nirbhay Inamdar (dual role) 
 Dhamal Bablya Ganpyachi (1990)
 Tuzhi Mazhi Jamli Jodi (1990) a.k.a. We Are Life Partners
 Ghanchakkar (1990)
 Ejaa Beeja Teeja (1990)
 Eka Peksha Ek (1989) ... Inspector Sarjerao Shinde
 Pheka Pheki (1989) ... Rajan Pradhan
 Baapre Baap (1990)
 Tiyya (1990)
 Dharla Tar Chavatay (1989) ... Raja Patil
 Savla Maroti (1989)
 Atmavishwas (1989) ... Vijay Zende
 Balache Baap Brahmachari (1989) .... Vilas
 Bhutacha Bhau (1989)
 Maalmasala (1989)
 Ek Gadi Baaki Anadi (1989)
 Kalat Nakalat (1989)
 Nawara Bayako (1989)
 Madhu Chandrachi Ratra (1989)
 Aaghat (1989)
 Ashi Hi Banwa Banwi (1988) ... Dhananjay Mane
 Aurat Teri Yehi Kahani (1988) .... Bhagwan Singh
 Changu Mangu (1988) .... Changu / Ayappa (dual role) 
 Maza Pati Karodpati (1988) ... Dinkar Luktuke
 Saglikade Bombabomb (1988)
 Disata Tas Nasata (1988)
 Mamla Poricha (1988)
 Pandharichi Vari (1988)
 Shiv Shakti (1988)
 Anandi Anand (1987)
 Chhakke Panje (1987) .... Ashok
 Gammat Jammat (1987) .... Phalgun Vadke
 Prem Karuya Khullam Khulla (1987) .... Bajarang
 Premasathi Vattel Te (1987)
 Gadbad Ghotala (1986) .... Hemant 'Hemu' Dhole a.k.a. Everything in Chaos
 Tuzya Vachun Karmena (1986)
 Khara Varasdar (1986)
 Dhum Dhadaka (1985) .... Ashok Gupchup / Yadhunath Javalkar
 Gaon Tasa Changla Pan Veshila Tangla (1985)
 Khichadi (1985)
 Sagge Soyare (1985)
 Ek Daav Bhutacha (1984) .... Mavala Bhut khandoji farjand
 Sasu varchadh Jawai (1984)
 BinKamacha Navara (1984)..... Tukaram/Tukya
 Gosht Dhamal Namyachi (1984).... Namdev/Namya
 Hech Mazha Maher (1984)..... Kammana
 Navri Mile Navryala (1984) .... Balasaheb Inamdar 
 Bahuroopi (1984)....Bahurupi
 Chawhata (1984)
 Kulswamini Ambabai (1984)
 Zakhmi Waghin (1984)
 Gulchaadi (1984)
 Jugalbandi (1984)
 Savvasher (1984)
 Thakas Mahathak (1984)
 Baiko Asavi Ashi (1983)
 Gupchup Gupchup (1983) .... Prof. Dhond
 Raghu Maina (1983)
 Kashala Udyachi Baat (1983)
 Galli Te Dilli (1982)
 Don Baika Fajiti Aika (1982)
 Maibaap (1982)
 Savitrichi Sun (1982)
 Ek Daav Bhutacha (1982)
 Aapalech Daat Aapalech Oth (1982)
 Bhannat Bhanu (1982)
 Daivat (1982)
 Gondhalat Gondhal (1981) .... Madan
 Sundara Satarkar (1981)
 Are Sansar Sansar (1981)
 Govinda Aala Re Aala (1981)
 Mosmabi Narangi (1981)
 Choravar Mor (1980)
 Phatakadi (1980)
 Sulavarchi Poli (1980)
 Hich Khari Daulat (1980)
 Sawaj (1980)
 Saubhagwan (1980)
 Sharan Tula Bhagwanta (1980)
 Paijecha Vida (1979)
 Chimanrao Gundyabhau (1979)
 Haldikunku (1979)
 Bailaveda (1979)
 Deed Shahane (1979)
 Sasurvashin (1978)
 Gyanabachi Mekh (1979)
 Sushila (1978)
 Ram Ram Gangaram (1977).....Mhamdu Khatik
 Navara Maja Bramhmachari (1977)
 Jawal Ye Laju Nako (1976)
 Tumacha Amacha Jamala (1976)
 Pandu Hawaldar (1975)
 Varat (1975)
 Pandoba Poragi Phasali (1975)
 Aalay Tufan Darayala (1973)
 Donhi Gharcha Pahuna (1971)
 Janaki (1969)

Hindi 

 Singham (Hindi) (2011) as Head Constable Savalkar 
 Familywala (Hindi) (2010) (Stuck/On Hold)

 Qatal E Aam (2005)
 Kyaa Dil Ne Kahaa (2002) as Mr. Patel
 Kuch Tum Kaho Kuch Hum Kahein (2002) as Govind
 Ittefaq (2001) as Shambhu Shikari
 Inteqam (2001) as Murli (Watchman)
 Jodi No.1 (2001) as Ashok Rai
 Aashiq (2001) as Constable
 Afsana Dilwalon Ka (2001) as Pyarebhai
 Joru Ka Ghulam (2000) .... P.K. Girpade
 Beti No. 1 (2000) .... Ram Bhatnagar
 Khoobsurat (1999) .... Mahesh Chaudhary (Gambler)
 Pyar Kiya To Darna Kya (1998) as Tadkalal
 Bandhan (1998) .... Chillu
 Koi Kisi Se Kum Nahin (1997) 
 Yes Boss (1997) as Johnny
 Gupt: The Hidden Truth (1997) as Havaldar Pandu
 Judge Mujrim (1997) as PA Natwar
 Koyla (1997) as Vedji
 Aisi Bhi Kya Jaldi Hai (1996) .... Dr. Avinash
 Army (1996 film)... Pascal
 Guddu (1995) as Baliya
 Aazmayish (1995) as Roshanlal
 Jamla Ho Jamla (1995)
 Karan Arjun (1995) as Munshiji
 Karan (1994 film)
 Nazar Ke Samne (1994) as Mamu
 Sangdil Sanam (1994) as Bhalchander a.k.a. Sangdil Sanam: The Heartless Lover (USA: DVD box title)
 Aa Gale Lag Jaa (1994) as Dhaniram
 Dil Hai Betaab (1993) as Vikram's employee
 Prem Deewane (1992) .... Shomu
 Sarphira (1992)
 Meera Ka Mohan (1992)
 Jagruti (1992) as Sevalal
 I Love You (1992)
 Naseebwaala (1992) as Gangaram Lalwani
 Benaam Badsha (1991) as Vinay Chandra Rathod a.k.a. VCR
 Yaara Dildara (1991)
 Chor Pe Mor (1990)
 Mahal (1989)
 Bade Ghar Ki Beti (1989) .... Kasturi
 Garibon Ka Daata (1989)
 Ghar Ghar Ki Kahani (1988) as Lallu Ram
 Pratighaat (1987) as Crooked Lawyer a.k.a. The Revenge
 Muddat (1986) as Narayan a.k.a. Ages
 Maa Beti (1986)
 Ghar Dwaar (1985) as Bahadur
 Phulwari (1984 film) as Rickshaw driver
 Abodh (1984) as Hanuman (Shankar's friend)
 Nagin (1981)
 Duniya Kari Salam (1979) as Shivanand
 Meri Biwi Ki Shaadi (1979) as Advocate Venkat Vyas
 Damaad (1978)

Marathi Natak (Drama)

Television series

References

External links

 

 
 

1947 births
Living people
Male actors in Marathi cinema
Male actors in Hindi cinema
Indian male television actors
Indian male comedians
Male actors in Marathi theatre
Marathi actors
Male actors from Mumbai
Indian male stage actors